The Liaison Squadron of 7th Aviation Corps (Serbo-Croatian: Eskadrila za vezu 7. vazduhoplovnog korpusa / Ескадрила за везу 7. ваздухопловног корпуса) was an aviation squadron of the Yugoslav Air Force formed in 1953 at Batajnica airfield.

The squadron was part of 7th Aviation Corps. It was equipped with various aircraft. The squadron was disbanded after 1956, estimated 1959.

Equipment
Ikarus Aero 2B/C 
Zlin 381

References

Yugoslav Air Force squadrons
Military units and formations established in 1949